Bolero is a 1934 American pre-Code musical drama film directed by Wesley Ruggles and starring George Raft and Carole Lombard. The Paramount production was a rare chance for Raft to star and to play a dancer, which had been his profession in New York City, rather than portraying a gangster. The film takes its title from the Maurice Ravel composition Boléro (1928). The supporting cast includes  William Frawley, Ray Milland, and Sally Rand.

Plot
The film is set in 1910 New York. Raoul De Baere is a coal miner who wants to be a dancer, and tries to persuade his brother Mike to manage him. He dreams of moving to Europe and opening a nightclub in Paris. He does not have a lot of success until he teams with a female partner, Lucy, and they make a success dancing in a beer garden in New Jersey. Lucy is attracted to Raoul but he does not want to mix business with pleasure.

Raoul travels to Paris where he makes a living dancing with elderly women in nightclubs. He finds a dance partner, Leona, and they have success together as a dance team in night clubs. Leona wants to start a romance with Raoul but he refuses. When Leona threatens to quit, Mike suggests Raoul start a romantic relationship with her, which he does, though he dislikes Leona's jealousy and wage demands.

A former Ziegfeld chorus girl, Helen Hathaway, approaches Raoul, suggesting they team up, saying she is a better dancer than Leona. Raoul agrees and he quits his Paris nightclub to go to England with Helen, dumping Leona. Raoul is attracted to Helen but, not wanting a repeat of the Leona situation, makes her promise that if he ever makes a move on her, she should reject him. She agrees and the two make a successful dance team. They appear on the bill with Annette, who does a "fan dance" and who suggests she and Raoul team up, pointing out Lord Coray is romantically interested in Helen.

Raoul is jealous. While holidaying in Belgium, Raoul and Helen fall in love and start an affair.

Raoul sets up his own night club in Paris and he and Helen devise a very athletic routine to be accompanied by Ravel's Boléro (an anachronism, as the composition was not written until 1928 and the scene takes place in 1914).

The night they are meant to debut "Bolero", World War I breaks out and the audience are talking about it instead of paying attention to the dance.  Raoul breaks off mid performance, and makes a patriotic speech, promising to not dance until the war is over. Helen is touched by Raoul's patriotism. However, when she finds out he just did it for publicity, to hold his own, in the limelight, during the major historic moment,  she breaks up with him and goes to work as a nurse, and marries Coray.

Raoul and Mike serve in the army during the war and Raoul is wounded. On Armistice Day, a doctor tells him if he ever exerts himself again, he may die. After the war he tries to find Helen and restart his dancing career. He cannot find her but he runs into Annette, and they team up again. Helen is glad that Raoul is dancing again, but she is very happy with Lord Robert Coray.

Raoul re-opens his smart nightclub in Paris featuring the famous "Bolero" dance performance. On the opening night, as he is about to start the show, he finds Annette drunk and unable to perform.

Fortunately, Helen is in the audience and agrees to stand in. Raoul hopes that she will rejoin him. They dance, perfectly, the passionate and elegant "Bolero", with some very athletic demands, to thunderous applause, though Helen and Mike see that Raoul is experiencing some serious physical stress moments.

The reunited pair are a success! Offstage, afterward, the applause does not end and the audience demands an encore. Mike and Helen say "NO encore – too much for Raoul" – but Raoul disagrees and insists they do the encore! Triumphant moments must not be let down!

Raoul gets Helen to agree to the encore, though she tells him it's her last and they must be wise and let it go. She is happy with her present life with Corday.

Raoul does not hear her words from the next room, because, basking in the glow of his goals won, and aiming at more to come, Raoul collapses and dies before he can get back onstage.

Helen and Mike find him, smiling with satisfaction, but dead of heart failure.

Cast

George Raft as Raoul De Baere
Carole Lombard as Helen Hathaway
Sally Rand as Annette
Ray Milland as Lord Robert Coray
Frances Drake as Leona
William Frawley as Mike DeBaere (Raoul's brother)
Gertrude Michael as Lady D'Argon
Gloria Shea as Lucy

Production

Development
The film was based on the life of the American dancer Maurice Mouvet, known professionally as Maurice (1889–1927). Maurice was born in New York and moved to Europe at a young age where he became famous for his dancing. He was romantically involved with several of his dancing partners; other partners left him to get married. Maurice died relatively young, of tuberculosis.

George Raft, whose character was based on Maurice, said he knew Maurice and taught him some dance steps. He refused to make the film until some changes to the script were made; Paramount put Raft on suspension, but later relented and made the changes. Before filming he said "If they [the public] don't go for me in this one, I might as well quit."

Miriam Hopkins was meant to play the female lead but fell ill while making Design for Living. She was replaced by Carole Lombard, even though Lombard had never danced professionally before.

The Hays Office were unhappy at the prospect of Sally Rand appearing in films but Paramount went ahead and employed her. She was paid $1200 a week for four weeks.

Shooting
Filming started in December 1933 and finished by January 1934. LeRoy Printz was dance director; he devised a new tango for the film called "Raftero".  The film was released before rigorous enforcement of the Hollywood Production Code would come into effect on July 1, 1934, under which at least two scenes would have been banned by the code. Firstly, George Raft tells Carole Lombard, when she auditions in his hotel room, to do so in her underwear; she complies. Later, Sally Rand performs her famous fan dance, in which she hides her nudity with two strategically positioned ostrich-feather fans. A double was used for Lombard in many of the shots in the dance scenes. Although regarded as a musical, the film has no songs.  Raft reportedly punched out the film's producer, Benjamin Glaser, during filming in December, although Glaser later said it was just a push. In February 1934 Raft wrote an article where he said he had been involved in "only" three fights during his career as a dancer and actor, and said the Bolero incident "was the most regrettable of these". Filmink magazine later said this was "an early warning sign that the star was turning into a bit of a tosser."

Reception
The Los Angeles Times called it "a silk-and-satins sex jaunt.. Raft, light on his feet but heavy on his lines, makes an ideal type pictorially for the role." The New York Times called it an "episodic story" adding "Raft is a vivid and pictorially interesting type, rather than an actor in the technical sense, and consequently he proves unequal to the full implications of the fame-hungry dancer. The exterior attractiveness which Mr. Raft brings to the rôle gives "Bolero" considerable color, nevertheless, and the film, without coming close to realizing the real possibilities of the story as an overpowering study of megalomania, does manage to be moderately entertaining."

The film was a box-office hit. It was such a success, the following year, Raft and Lombard made another film with a fairly similar plot and title, Rumba. However, this was much less successful.

Internationally celebrated ballroom dancers Veloz and Yolanda were hired as uncredited dance doubles and choreographers for both Bolero and Rumba. This fact was kept as a trade secret for decades. The long shots in Bolero are in fact of Veloz and Yolanda, though no indication is given that this particular dance number was one that the famed dance team ever performed as part of its own repertoire, while in Rumba, the dance steps are actually a simplified variation of a Veloz and Yolanda routine performed the previous year in the movie Many Happy Returns, starring Burns and Allen.  The dance music in Rumba,  however, was apparently written specifically for that movie, though no title is found in the credits.

Paramount were impressed with Ray Milland, who had been cast in the role after being away from Hollywood for a while. They later offered him a long-term contract.

In 1959 Raft announced he wanted to remake the film but no film resulted.

Influence
The dance routine was copied by Jayne Torvill and Christopher Dean for their famous ice dance routine to the same music.

Sally Rand's bubble dance was spoofed in Tex Avery's cartoon Hollywood Steps Out (1941).

References

Further reading

 John Douglas Eames. The Paramount Story, pub. Octopus, 1985
 Radio Times Guide to Films; published by BBC Worldwide annually

External links
 
 
Review of film at Variety

1934 films
1930s musical drama films
1934 romantic drama films
American musical drama films
American romantic drama films
American romantic musical films
American black-and-white films
Films directed by Wesley Ruggles
Paramount Pictures films
Films set in Paris
Films set in 1910
1930s romantic musical films
Films with screenplays by Kubec Glasmon
1930s American films